Taenaris cyclops is a butterfly in the family Nymphalidae. It was described by Otto Staudinger in 1894. It is found in New Guinea in the Australasian realm.

Subspecies
T. c. cyclops (eastern New Guinea)
T. c. ferdinandi (Fruhstorfer, 1904) (German New Guinea)
T. c. verbeeki  (Fruhstorfer, 1904) (Papua - Milne Bay)
T. c. misolensis Rothschild, 1916 (Misool)
T. c. occidentalis Rothschild, 1916 (West Irian - Geelvink Bay)
T. c. acontius (Brooks, 1944) (West Irian - South Geelvink Bay - Etna Bay)
T. c. interfaunus Rothschild, 1916 (West Irian - Humboldt Bay)

References

External links
Taenaris at Markku Savela's Lepidoptera and Some Other Life Forms

Taenaris
Butterflies described in 1894